Astra 2G is one of the Astra communications satellites owned and operated by SES, launched to the Astra 28.2°E orbital position on 27 December 2014, at 21:37:49 UTC from Baikonur Cosmodrome.

Astra 2G is positioned at 28.5° East (part of the Astra 28.2°E orbital position) and is the last of three "second generation" satellites launched to this position to replace the first generation Astra 2A, Astra 2B, Astra 2C and Astra 2D satellites originally positioned there between 1998 and 2001, and it joined Astra 2E and Astra 2F launched in 2013 and 2012, respectively.

Market 
Astra 2G carries both Ku-band and Ka-band payloads and will deliver broadcast, VSAT and broadband services to Europe, the Middle East and Africa, and will also provide the ability to connect West Africa to Europe via Ka-band. The Astra 28.2° East position was established in 1998 to provide digital television, digital radio and multimedia services to the United Kingdom and Ireland, and a major part of Astra 2G's  mission is to continue, extend and backup this provision. Along with Astra 2E and Astra 2F it will deliver programming to almost 13 million satellite homes, over 3 million cable homes, and 700,000 Internet Protocol television (IPTV_ homes in the United Kingdom and Ireland, in particular for channels from the major United Kingdom digital satellite television platforms, BSkyB and Freesat.

Astra 2G also supports SATMED, a satellite-based e-health platform developed by SES and supported by the Luxembourg Government and the Ministry for Cooperation and Humanitarian Action which enables communication between doctors, enabling the transfer and exchange of medical knowledge and supporting tools for medical e-learning and e-teaching to improve public health in emerging and developing countries, particularly in isolated areas.

Broadcasting footprints 
Astra 2G has three Ku-band downlink beams and one Ka-band beam:

 The European beam is centred on the Benelux countries with reception from a  dish available across most of Europe - west to the Portuguese eastern border, east to Belarus, north to Estonia and south to coast of North Africa.
 The UK beam provides maximum signal (for reception with  dishes) over the whole United Kingdom, Ireland, Benelux and northern France with a sharp roll-off of signal level outside this region, in close approximation of the UK beam of Astra 2D. This enables channels to be broadcast free-to-air but with reception effectively constrained to the British Isles, and has been the basis for the Freesat free-to-air United Kingdom platform.
 The strongest signals of the West Africa beam (receivable on  dishes) covers Côte d'Ivoire, Burkina Faso, Ghana, Togo, Benin, Nigeria and northern Cameroon, with additional "lobes" for parts of Gabon and Congo. Reception on larger dishes is available across the entire sub-Saharan west Africa region.
 The Ka-band footprint is centred on France with coverage over all of western Europe.

History 
The launch of Astra 2G was intended to be from the Baikonur Cosmodrome by International Launch Services (ILS) Proton-M launch vehicle a month earlier, on 28 November 2014 but technical problems with the launch vehicle caused it to be rolled back from the launch pad to undergo a component replacement. The satellite had arrived at Baikonur on 29 October 2014 after a delayed flight from Europe - an emergency landing of the transport aircraft in the city of Ulyanovsk due to engine trouble required replacement of the aircraft's engine and a two-day delay.

Finally launched successfully on 27 December 2014, at 21:37:49 UTC, the satellite was initially positioned at 21.0° East for three months and then tested at 43.5° East, before moving to the Astra 28.2° East position in June 2015.

On 18 June 2015, the first six channels, including ITV and Channel 4, began broadcasting from Astra 2G, transferred from Astra 2E, Astra 2F and, in particular from Eutelsat 28A, which was some two years beyond its expected end-of-life and operating with some transponders considerably under power. The final Eutelsat 28A channels, including the Freesat EPG data channel, transferred to Astra 2G on 29 June 2015.

Active transponders 
Below is a list of the television channels broadcast to the UK and Ireland from active transponders on Astra 2G :

See also 

 2014 in spaceflight
 SES (satellite operator)
 Astra (satellite family)
 Astra 28.2°E orbital position
 Astra 2E (co-located satellite)
 Astra 2F (co-located satellite)

References

External links 
 SES fleet information and map
 Official SES site
 Astra 2E Reception Overseas
 Astra 2G Information and Photos

Astra satellites
Communications satellites in geostationary orbit
Spacecraft launched in 2014
2014 in Luxembourg
Satellites of Luxembourg
Satellites using the Eurostar bus